A Short History of a Small Place is a 1985 novel by T. R. Pearson. Set in the fictional town of Neely, North Carolina – a thinly disguised Reidsville – it tells, in a rambling and digressive manner, about the life and eventual suicide of the town's only aristocratic woman, Miss Myra Angelique Pettigrew.

Short History of a Small Place, A
American comedy novels
Novels set in North Carolina
Fiction about suicide
1985 debut novels
Rockingham County, North Carolina